Rocky Hill is an unincorporated community in Bloomfield Township, Jackson County, Ohio, United States.

The name was changed to Rockyhill Post Office on June 6, 1894, and ultimately discontinued on May 31, 1919. Mail service is now handled by the Jackson branch.

At one time, there was a station here on the Cincinnati, Hamilton and Dayton Railway called Rocky Hill Station.

References 

Unincorporated communities in Jackson County, Ohio